The Tower of the Seven Hunchbacks (Spanish:La Torre de los Siete Jorobados) is a 1920 novel by the Spanish writer Emilio Carrere. It is a gothic mystery with elements of horror set in 19th-century Madrid. The body of the story itself is cobbled together from several of Carrere's pre-existing short stories.

There is some question over whether Carrere was solely responsible for the work, and some academics believe that Spanish science fiction writer Jesús de Aragón was responsible for substantial portions of the text.

Film adaptation
In 1944 the novel served as the basis for the film The Tower of the Seven Hunchbacks directed by Edgar Neville.

References

Bibliography
 Hardy, Phil & Milne, Tom. Horror. Aurum Press, 1996. 

1920 novels
20th-century Spanish novels
Novels set in Madrid
Spanish novels adapted into films
Spanish Gothic novels
Mystery novels